Soquel (Ohlone: Sokel) is an unincorporated town and census-designated place (CDP) in Santa Cruz County, California, located on the northern coast of Monterey Bay. The population was 9,980 at the 2020 census.

History

Osocalis was the Spanish phonetic rendering for the name of the creek which runs through the area, as transcribed from the local Native American Indian language of the  Ohlone peoples. The later name "Soquel," which was subsequently derived from the name of that creek, is first known to have appeared in 1833 as the name of the Mexican land grant which included this creek and adjacent lands.

The first European land exploration of Alta California, the Spanish Portolà expedition, passed through the area on its way north, camping at one of the creeks on October 16, 1769. The expedition diaries don't provide enough information to be sure which creek it was, but the direction of travel was northwest, parallel to the coast. Franciscan missionary Juan Crespi, traveling with the expedition, noted in his diary that, "We stopped on the bank of a small stream, which has about four varas of deep running water. It has on its banks a good growth of cottonwoods and alders; on account of the depth at which it runs it may be that it cannot be utilized to water some plains through which it runs." Translator Herbert Bolton speculated that the location was Soquel Creek.

Martina Castro was granted Rancho Soquel by Alta California governor José Figueroa in 1833. Martina was one of the daughters of Santa Cruz fundadore José Joaquín Castro, who came as a boy with his family to Alta California from Mexico with the second De Anza expedition in 1775. Several of Martina's Californio brothers and sisters also became rancheros.

The town of Soquel is notorious for its flooding. The lowlands in and around the Soquel Creek have flooded many times. The most recent flood was in January 1982, and it nearly topped its banks in 1986. Uncleared log jams downstream in the city of Capitola have been blamed for the flooding. Capitola City Planner Richard Steele implemented a debris removal program after the near flooding in 1986.

In 1965, Soquel was the location of the first "Acid Test" party.

Geography
Soquel is located at  (36.986991, -121.945636).

According to the United States Census Bureau, the CDP has a total area of 4.6 square miles (11.9 km), all of it land.

Soquel Creek flows through Soquel.

Demographics

2010
At the 2010 census Soquel had a population of 9,644. The racial makeup of Soquel was 7,898 (81.9%) White, 85 (0.9%) African American, 71 (0.7%) Native American, 356 (3.7%) Asian, 21 (0.2%) Pacific Islander, 693 (7.2%) from other races, and 520 (5.4%) from two or more races. Hispanic or Latino of any race were 1,606 persons (16.7%).

The census reported that 9,595 people (99.5% of the population) lived in households, 49 (0.5%) lived in non-institutionalized group quarters, and no one was institutionalized.

There were 3,912 households, 1,156 (29.6%) had children under the age of 18 living in them, 1,758 (44.9%) were opposite-sex married couples living together, 467 (11.9%) had a female householder with no husband present, 174 (4.4%) had a male householder with no wife present.  There were 266 (6.8%) unmarried opposite-sex partnerships, and 39 (1.0%) same-sex married couples or partnerships. 1,128 households (28.8%) were one person and 411 (10.5%) had someone living alone who was 65 or older. The average household size was 2.45.  There were 2,399 families (61.3% of households); the average family size was 3.00.

The age distribution was 1,942 people (20.1%) under the age of 18, 880 people (9.1%) aged 18 to 24, 2,215 people (23.0%) aged 25 to 44, 3,392 people (35.2%) aged 45 to 64, and 1,215 people (12.6%) who were 65 or older.  The median age was 43.2 years. For every 100 females, there were 91.8 males.  For every 100 females age 18 and over, there were 90.4 males.

There were 4,107 housing units at an average density of 893.2 per square mile, of the occupied units 2,750 (70.3%) were owner-occupied and 1,162 (29.7%) were rented. The homeowner vacancy rate was 1.4%; the rental vacancy rate was 2.4%.  6,654 people (69.0% of the population) lived in owner-occupied housing units and 2,941 people (30.5%) lived in rental housing units.

2000
At the 2000 census there were 5,081 people, 2,043 households, and 1,229 families in the CDP. The racial makeup of the CDP was 82.94% White, 1.57% African American, 0.63% Native American, 4.00% Asian, 0.18% Pacific Islander, 6.18% from other races, and 4.51% from two or more races. Hispanic or Latino of any race were 13.99%.

Of the 2,043 households 32.8% had children under the age of 18 living with them, 41.1% were married couples living together, 14.0% had a female householder with no husband present, and 39.8% were non-families. 27.7% of households were one person and 8.7% were one person aged 65 or older.  The average household size was 2.47 and the average family size was 3.02.

The age distribution was 24.6% under the age of 18, 8.5% from 18 to 24, 32.3% from 25 to 44, 24.6% from 45 to 64, and 10.1% 65 or older.  The median age was 37 years. For every 100 females, there were 87.2 males.  For every 100 females age 18 and over, there were 83.5 males.

The median household income was $55,230 and the median family income  was $61,167. Males had a median income of $48,750 versus $32,721 for females. The per capita income for the CDP was $28,360.  About 6.5% of families and 7.6% of the population were below the poverty line, including 10.8% of those under age 18 and 8.2% of those age 65 or over.

Government

Recreation
Anna Jean Cummings Park is the largest park in Soquel, with playfields for soccer, baseball, and softball, playgrounds, picnic areas, and a large open space of coastal prairie terrace. It is operated by the Santa Cruz County Parks Department. Recently completed in downtown Soquel, Heart of Soquel Park includes wooden walkways along Soquel Creek, bocce ball courts, and outdoor event spaces. Others include Richard Vessey, Soquel Lions, and Willowbrook Park. Based on a 1990 proposal, a park with a community center is under development on a property known as "The Farm".  The Land Trust of Santa Cruz County also owns two protected lands on Fairway Drive, the Greenspace Garden and the Fairway Drive Coastal Prairie Terrace.

Notable people

References

External links
Santa Cruz County Conference & Visitors Council - Capitola/Soquel Village Visitor Information
Santa Cruz Wiki - The People's Guide to Santa Cruz County, California.

 
Census-designated places in Santa Cruz County, California
Census-designated places in California